Venus Lux (born Talen Lee, October 10, 1990) is an American pornographic actress, director, producer, and educator.

Early life
Lux was born and raised in San Francisco, California, and is of Chinese and Mongolian descent. She is an only child. She worked as an escort, stripper, and bartender prior to her porn career.

Career
Lux entered the adult film industry in 2012 after receiving an email from a Kink.com talent scout. Her first scene was with Kaylee Hilton for tspussyhunter.com. When she first chose her stage name, Venus referred to the ruling planet for Libra while Lux was short for luxury. She later began to consider her stage name's original meaning to be "a bit tacky" and decided to change it. She now states that her stage name is Latin/Greek for love (Venus) and illumination (Lux).

Other ventures
Lux owns a studio called Venus Lux Entertainment. In December 2014, she signed an exclusive three-year distribution deal with Pulse Distribution. In 2012, she began writing a column titled "Venus Rising". She compiled some of those columns into a book titled Venus Lux Diaries, which was released in March 2015. In October 2015, she launched TransGlobal Magazine. In 2016, Venus Lux founded Syren Network and the website TS Fetishes, both of which launched in the spring. She is featured in the sequel of the documentary After Porn Ends titled After Porn Ends 2.

Personal life
In March 2009, Lux decided to transition from male-to-female. She began by presenting as female for a few weeks before undergoing hormone replacement therapy and breast augmentation surgery. She is half deaf in her right ear.

Mainstream media appearances

Awards and nominations

References

External links

 
 

1990 births
Actresses from San Francisco
American columnists
American female erotic dancers
American erotic dancers
American magazine founders
American magazine publishers (people)
American people of Chinese descent
American people of Mongolian descent
American pornographic film actors of Chinese descent
American pornographic film actresses
American pornographic film directors
American pornographic film producers
American prostitutes
Directors of transgender pornographic films
Film directors from San Francisco
American LGBT people of Asian descent
LGBT people from California
Living people
Pornographic film actors from California
Transgender women
Transgender pornographic film actresses
American women columnists
Women pornographic film directors
Women pornographic film producers
Writers from San Francisco
Transgender erotica
AVN Award winners
Transgender Erotica Award winners
American transgender writers